Oracle Enterprise Manager Ops Center (formerly Sun Ops Center) is a data center automation tool that simplifies discovery and management of physical and virtualized assets. Among its features it can:
Provide a single console for the management of both the physical and virtual infrastructure in a virtualized environment
Allow discovery of any existing infrastructure, including hardware that has just been unpacked and plugged in but has not been switched on
Power everything up and then provision this hardware with firmware, operating system hypervisors and other applications as required
Once operational, ensure that all the software on the servers, both physical and virtualized, can be automatically updated and patched
Enable custom reports to be generated for operational as well as compliance purposes.

Ops Center includes a browser-based, platform-independent interface that uses AJAX.

See also
 Sun xVM
 VirtualBox
 Sun VDI

References

External links
Oracle Enterprise Manager Ops Center home page
Oracle Enterprise Manager Ops Center Documentation
Ops Center developer forum
Ops Center Doctor - self diagnosis utility for Ops Center
Halcyon Neuron integration for Sun Ops Center

Sun Microsystems software
Virtualization software
Network management
System administration
Systems management